Graeme C. Simsion is a New Zealand-born Australian author, screenwriter, playwright, and data modeller, best known for his first novel The Rosie Project .

Early life and education 
Simsion was born in New Zealand and moved to Australia with his family when he was 12 years old. 

Prior to becoming an author, Simsion was an information systems consultant, co-authoring the book Data Modelling Essentials, and worked in wine distribution.

Literary career

Rosie novels 
In 2012 Simsion won the Victorian Premier's Unpublished Manuscript Award for his book The Rosie Project.  The novel was published by Text Publishing to critical acclaim in Australia in January 2014. By March 2016 it had sold more than three and a half million copies in over 40 countries around the world.

Simsion initially wrote The Rosie Project as a screenplay, which has since been optioned to Sony Pictures Entertainment.

A sequel titled The Rosie Effect, was published on 24 September 2014.

The third and final book, The Rosie Result, was published in February 2019.

Other novels 
Simsion's third novel, The Best of Adam Sharp was published by Text Publishing in 2016. Its movie rights were optioned to Toni Collette’s company Vocab Films.

Simsion's fourth novel Two Steps Forward, a collaboration with his wife Anne Buist, was published on 2 October 2017. Its sequel, titled Two Steps Onward, was published in June 2021.

Personal life
Simsion is married to psychiatrist Anne Buist and has two children.

In 2006 he obtained a PhD in data modelling  from the University of Melbourne.

Awards

The Rosie Project 
 International IMPAC Dublin Literary Award, Ireland, longlisted, 2015
 Australian Book Industry's Book of the Year, Winner, 2014
 Australian Book Industry's General Fiction Book of the Year, winner, 2014
 Nielsen BookData Booksellers Choice Award, shortlisted, 2014
 Best Debut Fiction, Independent Booksellers of Australia Awards, shortlisted, 2014 
 Waverton Good Read Award, United Kingdom, shortlisted, 2014  
 The Indie Awards, shortlisted, 2014  
 Victorian Premier's Award for Best Unpublished Manuscript, Winner, 2012

The Rosie Effect 

 Indie Book Awards, shortlisted, 2015
 Nielsen BookData Booksellers Choice Award, shortlisted, 2015
 Australian Book Industry General Fiction Award, shortlisted, 2015

Other awards 
 Doctor of Communication Honoris Causa - RMIT
The Age Short Story Award (2012) – second prize - Three Encounters with the Physical
 Stringybark Seven Deadly Sins Award (2012) - second prize - Eulogy for a Sinner

Publications

Novels 
Two Steps Onward, with Anne Buist, Text Publishing, Melbourne, 2021 
The Rosie Result, Text Publishing, Melbourne, 2019 
 Two Steps Forward, with Anne Buist, Text Publishing, Melbourne, 2017 
 The Best of Adam Sharp, Text Publishing, Melbourne, 2016 
 The Rosie Effect, Text Publishing, Melbourne, 2014 
 The Rosie Project, Text Publishing, Melbourne, 2012

Short stories 
 Intervention on the Number 3 Tram, Review of Australian Fiction, 2017.
 Like It Was Yesterday, Review of Australian Fiction, 2015.
 The Life and Times of Greasy Joe, The Big Issue, 2015.
 A Visit to the Other Side, Conde Nast Traveller, 2013.
 Three Encounters with the Physical, The Age Short Story Award, 2013.
 Cutting, Behind the Wattles, 2012.
 Eulogy for a Sinner, Seven Deadly Sins, 2012.
 A Confession in Three Parts, The Road Home, 2012.
 Savoir Faire, The Road Home, 2012.
 Natural Selection, The Road Home, 2012.
 A Short Submission to the Coroner, Tainted Innocence, 2012.
 GSOH, Tainted Innocence, 2012.
 The Klara Project Phase 1, The Envelope Please, 2007.

Technical 
 Simsion, Milton and Shanks: "Data Modeling: Description or Design?" Information and Management, May 2012.
 "Data Modeling: Theory and Practice" by Graeme Simsion, 2007, Technics Publications, 
 "Data Modeling Essentials" by Graeme Simsion & Graham Witt, 2004 3rd ed, Morgan Kaufmann, San Francisco 
 Moody, D and Simsion, G: "Justifying Investment in Information Resource Management", Australian Journal of Information Systems, September 1995.
 "A Structured Approach to Data Modeling", Australian Computer Journal, August,1989.
 Simsion, G.C and Symington, J.A: "A Comparison of Network and Relational Database Architectures in a Commercial Environment", Australian Computer Journal, November 1981.

Short films and plays 
 Thought Tracker, Producer, Premiere: Westside Shorts, 2013
 Decisions, Writer-Producer, Premiere: Westside Shorts, 2012
 The Prince, Writer-Producer, Premiere: Westside Shorts, 2012
 The Perfect Gift, Writer-Producer, (Director: Carley Sheffield), Premiere: Toronto Urban Film Festival, 2012
 Reason for Living, Producer-Director, Premiere: Bondi Film Festival, 2012
 Push Up, Writer-Producer, (Director: Jason Christou), Premiere: Flickerfest Film Festival, Sydney, 2010
 The Last Bottle, Writer-Producer, (Directors Michael Carsen and Beth Child), Premiere: Zero Film Festival (New York), 2010, ABC Television, 2010
 Transformation, Writer-Producer, (Director: Rebecca Peniston-Bird), Premiere: St Kilda Film Festival, 2009, ABC Television, 2010
 Red Porsche, Writer-Producer, (Director: Chris Wurm), Premiere: Westside Shorts, 2009
 Turning Back the Clocks, Writer-Producer, (Director: Michael Carsen), Premiere: Janison Short and Sharp Film Festival, 2009
 Prisoner's Dilemma, Writer, Premiere: Short and Sweet Festival, Melbourne, 2008
 Hot Water, Writer, Premiere: Defector Theatre, Melbourne, 2008
 Key Change, Writer-Producer, (Director: David Grant), Premiere: Katoomba Film Festival, 2008

References

External links
 "Simsion & Associates"
 
 

1956 births
21st-century Australian novelists
Australian male novelists
Australian non-fiction writers
Monash University alumni
University of Melbourne alumni
People from Auckland
Living people
21st-century Australian male writers
Male non-fiction writers